

Barracks existed in Hong Kong before 1997
The following barracks existed in Hong Kong before 1997.

 Argyle Street Camp, built as a refugee camp before World War II
 Bowring Camp
 Chamham Road Camp
 Dodwell's Ridge Camp
 Erskine Camp
 Lyemoon Barracks
 Little Sai Wan Camp
 Murray Barracks
 North Point Camp, built as a refugee camp before World War II
 Sai Kung Camp
 Shamshuipo Barracks
 Sunny Farm Camp
 Victoria Barracks
 Wellington Barracks
 Whitfield Barracks

Barracks/Camps given to the HKSAR Government in 1997
The following barracks were given to the HKSAR Government in 1997.
 Mount Austin Mansions Block A and E
 Royen Court
 Cape Mansions
 Harcourt Place
 So Kon Po Sport Ground
 Blackdown Barracks
 Joint Movements Unit, Kai Tak
 British Military Hospital
 Tudor Court
 Vista Panorama
 Kowloon Tsai Married Quarters
 St. George's School
 Mission Road Sports Ground
 Burma Lines Camp
 Lo Wu Camp (now Lo Wu Correctional Institution)
 Lo Wu Firing Range
 Dills Corner Camp
 Beas Stables Married Quarters
 Ping Chau Training Camp
 High Island Training Camp
 Naval Base, North Stonecutters
 Perowne Camp
 Gordon Hard
 Pearl Island Married Quarters

Barracks that still exist in Hong Kong
The following barracks still exist in Hong Kong now.
 Central Barracks
 Headquarters House
 Chek Chue Barracks
 Ching Yi To Barracks, formerly known as "Queen's Line"
 Western Barracks
 Gun Club Hill Barracks
 Kowloon East Barracks, formerly known as "Osborn Barracks"
 No. 1A Cornwall Street
 Ngong Shuen Chau Barracks
 Shek Kong Barracks
 Northern Compound of Shek Kong Barracks
 Southern Compound of Shek Kong Barracks
 Shek Kong Airfield
 San Tin Barracks
 Tam Mei Barracks - former Cassino Lines
 Gallipoli Lines - named for Gallipoli Campaign of World War I
 San Wai / Ting Ling Firing Range
 Tai O Barracks
 Tsing Shan Close Quarter Battle Range and Tsing Shan Firing Range
 Military Transportation Centre, Chek Lap Kok

References

 List
Military of Hong Kong under British rule